Thadam is a 2019 Indian Tamil-language crime thriller film written and directed by Magizh Thirumeni. Produced by Inder Kumar, the film stars Arun Vijay in a double role along with Vidya Pradeep , Tanya Hope, and Smruthi Venkat . The music was composed by Arun Raj, with cinematography by Gopinath and editing by N. B. Srikanth. It marks the Tamil debut of Tanya and the film debut of Smruthi. In the film, police officers try to solve a murder case involving lookalike suspects arrested on the basis of a pictorial evidence.

Thadam was released theatrically on 1 March 2019, opening to critical acclaim with praise for Arun Vijay's performance and the writing. It was commercially successful, becoming one of the highest-grossing films of the year in Tamil Nadu..

Plot
Ezhil, is a civil engineer from IIT Madras, while his lookalike Kavin, is a gambling thief who deceives people along with his sidekick Suruli. Ezhil's love interest is an IT girl Deepika, while a girl named Ananthi, loves Kavin, unaware of his real identity. One day, Kavin tries to help Suruli pay his debt by extracting money from Ananthi through lies, but she helps him in spite of knowing the truth. After taking the money, Kavin is enraged, and so is Ezhil after a party. That night, one of them breaks into a house and attacks the owner Akash, stabbing him to death. The next day, Kavin frees Suruli by paying his debt and wins Ananthi's trust by returning her money and telling her the truth. However, as the investigation of Akash's murder proceeds, a selfie clicked by a couple nearby is found with either of Ezhil or Kavin in it. 

Both Ezhil and Kavin are brought in and investigated without their knowledge of each other's existence. Gopalakrishnan, inspector who shares an old rivalry with Ezhil, tortures him. Ezhil reveals his car broke down, and a call taxi driver helped him, as he didn't have the repair kit. SI Malarvizhi interrogates Kavin, who on the other hand, cites various laws to escape torture.  She reaches out to Akash's friend and shows him the photograph of Ezhil/Kavin, but he refuses to recognize him. She also questions Suruli and tells him not to leave the city without permission, but he secretly escapes. Malarvizhi then learns of the rivalry between Ezhil and Gopalakrishnan; Ezhil helped the latter's daughter elope with her lover, much against her father's wishes. The forensic expert informs Malarvizhi about a hair sample recovered from the crime scene and how it doesn't match anyone else in Akash's home.

At the police station, Ezhil tries to escape but is interrupted by Kavin. The two violently fight, hurting everyone and vandalizing the station in the process. Kavin and Ezhil are revealed to be identical twins after their DNA is found identical, and both confess about the same; they parted ways when their parents divorced. Kavin went with his mother, who used to gamble a lot, but wouldn't refuse anyone who asks her help, and one day tried to convince him that she'd give up gambling, but instead committed suicide. Kavin was then taken in by his father but got into a violent fight with him and Ezhil. Both of them were admitted into a mental institution as a result. Growing up as their father died, Kavin became interested in studying the law but left studies due to his lack of college ethics. One day, when Kavin came home and left in front of Ezhil, whose ring for Deepika went missing, Ezhil reported him to the police. 

The police beat up Kavin, who himself told Ezhil to look for the ring in the drawer. Ezhil realized his mistake, but Kavin, who came home for a photo of their mother, vowed to seek revenge. On the other hand, Gopalakrishnan still wants to frame Ezhil, but the call taxi driver who helped Ezhil confirms he was really stuck on the night of the murder. It also gets proved that Kavin paid Suruli's debt with gambling money he won after playing all night. The sessions court, weeks later, acquits both Kavin and Ezhil in order to protect the innocent one from punishment. Gopalakrishnan retires without getting his revenge. Months later, while shifting the items of the Police station, Malarvizhi gets glimpse of Deepika's photo in Akash's case, and calls Akash's friend to inquire about the girl he was infatuated with, and was shocked to learn that it was Deepika. Ezhil is finally revealed to have murdered Akash for drugging, kidnapping and raping Deepika to death out of his childhood lust. Akash also bribed the police to avoid charges. When Kavin found out about Akash's murder, he helped Ezhil by getting officially arrested himself as well to throw off the police.

Later, Kavin meets Ezhil on the highway and explains how Malarvizhi can't reopen the case as she created a fake witness to help Ezhil, and could herself get arrested, having done this once which resulted in her suspension. Ezhil hands him over a photograph of them with their mother and tells him he is going to Mumbai, and later to Copenhagen, never to return. Having sold all of his property in India, Ezhil gives a 50% share to Kavin as a tribute. After his marriage with Ananthi, Kavin realizes his lack of trust in his mother prompted her to kill herself. He promises to do better with his wife.

Seven months later, some of the investigating officers appear for a documentary shooting. One of the investigating officers calls the case unprecedented, before someone tells him similar cases occurred in other countries as well.

Cast

Arun Vijay as Ezhil and Kavin (Dual roles)
Tanya Hope as Deepika, Ezhil's love interest
Smruthi Venkat as Ananthi, an innocent woman and Kavin's one-sided lover 
Vidya Pradeep as Sub-Inspector Malarvizhi
Satyajit Dhananjayan as Ezhil and Kavin's father
Sonia Aggarwal as Lakshmi, Ezhil and Kavin's mother
Vijayan as Inspector M. Gopalakrishnan
Yesakkiappan as Aakash
Yogi Babu as Suruli
George as Police Constable Dhanasekar 
Meera Krishnan as Chechi

Production
In March 2017, Arun Vijay revealed that he would next work on a film directed by Magizh Thirumeni, which marks the second film for the duo after Thadaiyara Thaakka (2012). Produced by Inder Kumar, the film was launched in April 2017 at Chennai. Arun Vijay was reported to be playing a double role, while the film would be based on a real life story. The film has three heroines, Tanya Hope, Vidya Pradeep and Smruthi Venkat. Arun Raj was selected to compose the music for this film, marking his first collaboration between Magizh Tirumeni and Arun Vijay. Gopinath and N. B. Srikanth were signed on to be the film's cinematographer and editor. FEFSI Vijayan and Meera Krishnan were also cast in the film before the film entered production in June 2017.

Home Media 
It is currently available on Sun NXT. A Hindi dubbed version is also available on YouTube (Aditya Movies channel).

Critical reception
Sify stated 3.5 out of 5 stars stating "The presentation is smart and stylish. An engaging whodunit thriller from the word go. The biggest strength is Arun Vijay and his convincing performance as Ezhil and Kavin". The Times of India rated 3.5 out of 5 stars stating "Thadam has an intriguingly written flow of events which begins from the pre-interval point and maintains the suspense factor till the end". Behindwoods rated 3 out of 5 stars stating "Thadam's intriguing screenplay especially in the second half makes it an engaging investigative thriller that should not be missed". The Hindu stated "Thadam by Magizh Thirumeni is an effective murder mystery involving identical twins". Film Companion rated 2.5 out of 5 stars stating "The cinematographer keeps throwing in slightly angled frames, which give the sense of a dual reality: one normal, one skewed. We think we know who did it — but do we?" India Today rated 2.5 out of 5 stars stating "Director Magizh Thirumeni's second film with Arun Vijay, Thadam, deals with a sensitive and intriguing murder mystery. But the screenplay is messed up and filled with spoonfeeding moments, says our review". IndiaGlitz rated 2.75 out of 5 stars stating "Go for this murder mystery/psychological thriller film that is different from the usual fare". The Indian Express rated 3 out of 5 stars stating "At first glance, Thadam, inspired by real events, comes across as a pretty straightforward urban thriller. But as the layers peel, you discover it is cleverly written—in parts". Firstpost rated 3 out of 5 stars stating "Thadam is an out-and-out Arun Vijay film. A well made thriller which takes the audiences by surprise in its climax with some twists and turns". Deccan Chronicle rated 3.5 out of 5 stars stating "Barring couple of dull moments, Thadam is a well-written engrossing thriller worth a watch". The News Minute rated 3 out of 5 stars stating "The film has a deceptively simple storyline but the treatment makes all the difference".

Soundtrack 
This film's soundtrack is composed by Arun Raj making his debut as a music director. Lyrics are written by Arun Raj, Madhan Karky, Thamarai, and Magizh Thirumeni

Box Office
Thadam grossed Rs 2.3 cr in its third weekend, taking its estimated cumulative gross in Tamil Nadu to Rs 18.4 cr at the end of 20 days.

Remakes 
A Telugu remake, Red was theatrically released in 2021 with Ram Pothineni stepping in the shoes of Arun Vijay alongside Nivetha Pethuraj and Malvika Sharma. The remake was backed by Sri Sravanthi Movies and was directed by Kishore Tirumala. Red was also dubbed and released theatrically in Kannada (titled as Clue), whereas the Tamil and Malayalam language dubbed versions were released directly on Sun NXT OTT platform. A Hindi dubbed version was also premiered directly on the Goldmines TV channel in September 2022.

In 2021, a Hindi remake was also announced by T-Series and Cine1 Studios, starring Aditya Roy Kapoor and Mrunal Thakur. The movie title was announced to be Gumraah. It is scheduled to be theatrically released on 7 April 2023.

References

External links 
 

2019 films
2010s Tamil-language films
2019 crime thriller films
Indian crime thriller films
Tamil films remade in other languages
Twins in Indian films
Films about murder
Films directed by Magizh Thirumeni